Manoylin is a rural locality (a khutor) and the administrative center of Manoylinskoye Rural Settlement, Kletsky District, Volgograd Oblast, Russia. The population was 799 as of 2010. There are 13 streets.

Geography 
Manoylin is located on the Krepkaya River, 44 km southwest of Kletskaya (the district's administrative centre) by road. Ternovoy is the nearest rural locality.

References 

Rural localities in Kletsky District